Valdocco (Valdòc in Piedmontese) is a neighborhood of the city of Turin, located in the urban district Aurora.
It is bordered by Corso Regina Margherita, Via Cigna, the river Dora and the railway. The name Valdocco comes from the Latin vallis occisorum (Valley of the Slain) since several death sentences were carried out on this site. 

Valdocco is also known for housing one of the main centers of the Congregation of the Salesians.

Giovanni Bosco, who was canonized as a saint in the Roman Catholic Church, used to visit the Pinardi's canopy in this area. From here he started his activities in favour of young people from the neighborhood.
Giovanni Bosco commissioned the construction of the Basilica of Our Lady Help of Christians in order to coordinate all activities related to the Salesians in the Valdocco suburb.

Notes

External links
Valdocco in Scheda su MuseoTorino.it  online.

Neighbourhoods in Italy

Districts of Turin